Caecilia gracilis is a species of caecilian in the family Caeciliidae. It is found in Brazil, French Guiana, Peru, Suriname, possibly Colombia, and possibly Guyana. Its natural habitats are subtropical or tropical moist lowland forests, moist savanna, plantations, rural gardens, and heavily degraded former forest.

References

gracilis
Amphibians described in 1802
Taxonomy articles created by Polbot